Patrick Franziska (born 11 June 1992) is a German table tennis player. He is currently sponsored by Butterfly and plays with FC Saarbrücken-TT in the German Bundesliga (TTBL).

Career

2021 
Patrick Franziska represented Germany at the Tokyo Olympics. In March, he entered the WTT Star Contender event at WTT Doha, but lost 11-9 in the fifth to Sharath Kamal.

Table tennis career
 2010 European Championships - Gold in Team Event
 2013 European Championships - Gold in Team Event
 2014 European Championships - Silver in Team Event
 2014 World Championships - Silver in Team Event
 2015 European Championships - Silver in Team Event
 2016 European Championships - Gold in Men's Doubles
 2017 European Championships - Gold in Team Event
 2018 World Championships - Silver in Team Event
 2018 European Championships - Bronze in Singles, Bronze in Men's Doubles and Bronze in Mixed Doubles Event
 2019 World Championships - Bronze in Mixed Doubles Event

References

External links

Living people
1992 births
German male table tennis players
World Table Tennis Championships medalists
Table tennis players at the 2019 European Games
European Games medalists in table tennis
European Games gold medalists for Germany
People from Bergstraße (district)
Sportspeople from Darmstadt (region)
Table tennis players at the 2020 Summer Olympics
Olympic table tennis players of Germany
Olympic medalists in table tennis
Olympic silver medalists for Germany
Medalists at the 2020 Summer Olympics